The women's individual skating event held as part of the figure skating at the 1920 Summer Olympics. It was the second appearance of the event and the sport, which had previously been held in 1908.

Six skaters from four nations competed. Despite receiving no first place votes from the judges in the women's singles, Magda Julin of Sweden captured the gold on the strength of three second-place ordinals. She was three months pregnant at the time.

Theresa Weld caused a minor controversy by performing jumps such as salchows and loops, the only woman in the event to do any jumps beyond modest hops. She was told that such jumps were not considered suitable for a lady's program and that some judges marked down as a result.

Results

Referee:
  Victor Lundquist

Judges:
  August Anderberg
  Louis Magnus
  Eudore Lamborelle
  Knut Ørn Meinich
  Herbert Yglesias

References

Sources
 
 

Figure skating at the 1920 Summer Olympics
1920 in figure skating
Fig
Oly